The Overtown Historic District (also known as Black Bottom) is a U.S. historic district (designated as such on July 19, 2002) located in Sarasota, Florida. The district runs roughly along Central and Cohen Avenues, between 9th and 4th Streets. It contains 25 historic buildings.

References

External links
 Sarasota County listings at National Register of Historic Places

National Register of Historic Places in Sarasota County, Florida
Historic districts on the National Register of Historic Places in Florida
Buildings and structures in Sarasota, Florida